The 2014 season was Grêmio Foot-Ball Porto Alegrense's 111th season in existence and the club's 9th consecutive season in the top flight of Brazilian football. Grêmio signed Enderson Moreira as the new manager, who left his position at Goiás to join the club.

Season summary
Grêmio started the season using a top squad of its academy, the under-20s team, at the beginning of the Campeonato Gaúcho, because the first team squad had extended its pre-season due to participation in the 2014 Copa Libertadores. Despite starting with the under-20s, Grêmio came with confidence to the final of the Campeonato Gaúcho. However, they were defeated 6–2 on aggregate to their biggest rival, Internacional, as a result of their weakened squad due to players missing that were competing simultaneously in the Copa Libertadores.

In the Copa Libertadores, Grêmio qualified for the round of 16 with the second best overall record amongst all 32 teams, although they still finished second in the second phase of the perceived "group of death". In the last 16 the club's opponents were San Lorenzo, and, with injuries to three of their main players (Luan, Wendell and Rhodolfo), Grêmio was eliminated in a penalty shoot-out.

On 20 April, Grêmio debuted in the 2014 Campeonato Brasileiro Série A against Atlético Paranaense, finishing with a 1–1 draw. In this game and the next, the club could not use its major players, as they were still prioritizing the Libertadores. Before the season stopped for the 2014 FIFA World Cup, in the ninth fixture, Grêmio had 15 points from 27 available, and were in 6th place in the table. During the break, the club strengthened by bringing in four new players for the return sequence of the season, with the main names being Giuliano and Fernandinho. On 16 July, the season resumed with Grêmio drawing 0–0 against Goiás.

On 27 July, following a 2–3 home loss to Coritiba, the Grêmio board of directors decided to part ways with head coach Moreira. Following this, the under-20 team head coach André Jardine was promoted to caretaker until a new head coach was hired. Two days later, Grêmio announced Luiz Felipe Scolari, who had managed the Brazil national team during the 2014 FIFA World Cup, as new head coach. He made his coaching debut for the club against rivals Internacional in the fourteenth fixture of the Série A, which ended in a 0–2 away loss.

In the Copa do Brasil, Grêmio played against Santos in the round of 16. On 28 August in the first leg, Grêmio was defeated 2–0 at home. In this match, there was an incident of racism by a small group of Grêmio supporters against Santos goalkeeper Aranha, which resulted in the deduction of three points in the league for Grêmio, the suspension of the second leg, and, with that, the qualification of Santos to the next round. Grêmio was also fined €18,000.

Club

Staff

Board members
 President: Fábio Koff
 Vice-president: Adalberto Preis
 Vice-president: Romildo Bolzan Jr.
 Vice-president: Odorico Roman
 Vice-president: Nestor Hein
 Vice-president: Marcos Herrmann
 Vice-president: Renato Moreira
 Director of football: Duda Kroeff
 Executive of football: Rui Costa
 Superintendent: Antônio Carlos Verardi
 Supervisor of football: Luís Vagner Vivian

Coaching staff
 Head coach: Luiz Felipe Scolari
 Assistant coach: Flávio Murtosa
 Assistant coach: Ivo Wortmann
 Permanent assistant coach: André Jardine
 Fitness coach: Fábio Mahseredjian
 Assistant fitness coach: Rogério Dias Luiz
 Assistant fitness coach: Mário Pereira
 Goalkeeper coach: Rogério Godoy
 Performance analyst: Eduardo Cecconi

Medical staff
 Head doctor: Saul Berdichevski
 Assistant head doctor: Fábio Krebs
 Doctor: Márcio Bolzoni
 Doctor: Felipe do Canto
 Doctor: Paulo Rabaldo
 Doctor: Márcio Dornelles
 Physiologist: José Leandro
 Physiologist: Rafael Gobbato
 Physiotherapist: Henrique Valente
 Physiotherapist: Felipe Marques
 Massagist: Marco Zeilmann
 Massagist: José Flores
 Massagist: Anderson Meurer
 Nurse: Adriano Welter
 Nutritionist: Katiuce Borges

Other staff
 Press officer: João Paulo Fontoura
 Cameraman: Juares Dagort
 Equipment manager: Marco Severino
 Equipment manager: Danilo Bueno
 Assistant equipment manager: Antônio Marcos
 Butler: Paulo Oliveira
 Chief security: Luiz Fernando Cardoso
 Security: Cristiano Nunes
 Security: Pedro Carvalho
 Security: André Trisch
 Caretaker: Moacir da Luz
 Motorist: Valdeci Coelho
Last updated: 24 September 2014.
Source: Portal Oficial do Grêmio

Kit
Supplier: Topper
Sponsor(s): Banrisul / TIM / Unimed / Tramontina

This is the last season in which Topper supplies kits for Grêmio, after three years of partnership. For this year, the home kit follows the traditional tricolor design with blue, black and white stripes, this time with blue collars and black accents on the sleeves, inspired by the kit used in 1928. In away kit remained white in focus, however, with a detail in blue and white chest differentiating recent shirts. In 2014 it was not released the third kit. A new feature was presented in training kits, with yellow gaining ground with the traditional blue, in homage to Brazil, which hosts in the second time of the history the FIFA World Cup. Other colors can not be used beyond the three traditional in the match kits.

Squad information

First team squad

Starting XI
4–3–3 Formation

Transfers and loans

Transfers in

Loans in

Transfers out

Loans out

Overall transfer activity

Spending

Transfer:  €12,780,000

Loan:  €495,000

Total:  €13,275,000

Income

Transfer:  €17,650,000

Loan:  €0

Total:  €17,650,000

Expenditure

Transfer:  €4,870,000

Loan:  €495,000

Total:  €4,375,000

Friendlies

Pre-season

Mid-season

Competitions

Overall

Campeonato Gaúcho

Results summary

Group stage

Matches

Knockout stage

Quarter-final

Semi-final

Finals

Copa Libertadores

Group stage

Knockout stage

Round of 16

Campeonato Brasileiro

League table

Results summary

Matches

Copa do Brasil

Matches

Round of 16

Statistics

Appearances

As of 7 December 2014. 
Source: Match reports in Competitions

Goalscorers
The list include all goals in competitive matches.

As of 7 December 2014.
Source: Match reports in Competitions

Clean sheets

As of 7 December 2014.
Source: Match reports in Competitions

Overview
{|class="wikitable"
|-
|Games played        || 66 (19 Campeonato Gaúcho, 8 Copa Libertadores, 38 Campeonato Brasileiro, 1 Copa do Brasil)
|-
|Games won           || 32 (10 Campeonato Gaúcho, 5 Copa Libertadores, 17 Campeonato Brasileiro)
|-
|Games drawn         || 17 (5 Campeonato Gaúcho, 2 Copa Libertadores, 10 Campeonato Brasileiro)
|-
|Games lost          || 17 (4 Campeonato Gaúcho, 1 Copa Libertadores, 11 Campeonato Brasileiro, 1 Copa do Brasil)
|-
|Goals scored        || 80
|-
|Goals conceded      || 46
|-
|Goal difference     || +34
|-
|Clean sheets        || 33
|-
|Best result         || 4–0 (H) v Aimoré - Campeonato Gaúcho - 26 January
|-
|Worst result        || 1–4 (A) v Internacional - Campeonato Gaúcho 13 April
|-
|Top scorer          || Barcos (29)
|-

Awards

Player

Last updated: 7 December 2014.

References

External links
Grêmio official website. Portal Oficial do Grêmio.
Twitter profile. Twitter.
Geral do Grêmio official website. Geral do Grêmio.
Unofficial media website. Ducker.com.br.
Coleção Grêmio Gianfranco . The best online collection of Grêmio memorabilia; organized by Gianfranco Spolaore.
Grêmio Foot-Ball Porto Alegrense. Zero Zero.
Grêmio Porto Alegrense News. Grêmio Lotyh.

2014 Season
Brazilian football clubs 2014 season